The Barn Church is a parish church of the Church of Scotland at Culloden, in the Presbytery of Inverness.  Although the congregation is relatively young, and only received full status as a parish church in its own right in the late 1980s, the building is of considerable historical interest.  It was originally built as a tithe barn for the estate of Culloden House, and in 1746 it was used by the Jacobite army as accommodation on the night before the Battle of Culloden.  During the 19th century it was used as a blacksmith's workshop, before being taken over by the East Church of Inverness as a mission station in the early 20th century.  When it was granted the status of a church extension charge in the 1970s, the congregation erected a new church called "the New Barn" (designed with architectural "barn metaphors") which is joined to the old building; the historic building (the "Old Barn") today serves as the church hall.  Interesting architectural features of the Old Barn include the slit windows for defensive purposes and the parallel doors which can create a wind tunnel required for winnowing.

The Church serves the Culloden, Balloch, Smithton, Westhill and Cradlehall areas on the outskirts of Inverness.

On Friday, 14 November 2014, the new minister, the Rev. Mike Robertson, was ordained and inducted. The previous minister, the Rev. Jim Robertson, had served for about 20 years.

See also
List of Church of Scotland parishes
 Barn Church in Kew, London, England
Barn Church in Michigan, United States

External links
Barn Church Facebook Page
Inverness Presbytery 
Barn Church Website

Culloden
Culloden
Barns in the United Kingdom